Charlie Faulkner Plummer (born May 24, 1999) is an American actor. Plummer began his career as a child actor in short films before appearing on the television dramas Boardwalk Empire and Granite Flats. In 2019, he starred in the Hulu miniseries Looking for Alaska as Miles "Pudge" Halter and received critical acclaim. In 2022, he starred as young Franklin D. Roosevelt in the Showtime series The First Lady.

He made his feature film debut in David Chase's drama Not Fade Away (2012) before landing the lead role in Felix Thompson's directorial debut King Jack (2015). In 2017, he gained wider recognition for his supporting role in Ridley Scott's crime thriller All the Money in the World, and his lead role in Andrew Haigh's drama Lean on Pete. His performance in the latter garnered critical praise and earned him the Marcello Mastroianni Award for best emerging actor at the 74th Venice Film Festival.

Early life 
Plummer was born in Poughkeepsie, New York, to theatre actress Maia Guest and writer-producer John Christian Plummer, and grew up in Cold Spring. He has a younger brother, James. His family moved frequently due to his parents' jobs which resulted in his attending seven different schools growing up: three in Los Angeles, two in upstate New York and two in New York City. Despite being very shy as a child, Plummer was exposed to acting at an early age by his parents, both of whom had worked in theatre. He gained experience acting in local stage productions of plays and musicals, crediting the experience with the latter for sparking his love of acting. He met his current manager at the age of ten when he first sought professional acting roles. Plummer eventually transferred to and attended the Professional Children's School in Manhattan due to his demanding filming schedule on television shows.

Career 
As a child, Plummer acted in short films such as Frank (2010), Three Things (2011), and Alan Smithee (2012). In 2011, Plummer starred in eight episodes of HBO's television period drama Boardwalk Empire. He portrayed Eli Thompson's son Michael in season 2, 3 and 4. In 2012, Plummer made his feature film debut by playing a supporting role in David Chase's drama Not Fade Away. The film was released on December 21, 2012, by Paramount Vantage and received positive reviews. In 2013, Plummer joined the BYUtv's drama series Granite Flats, in which he played the lead role of Timmy Sanders. He starred in all 24 episodes of three seasons, which premiered on Netflix and officially ended on June 25, 2015.

In 2015, he played the lead role of Jack in Felix Thompson's directorial debut King Jack. The film premiered at the Tribeca Film Festival on April 17, 2015.

In 2017, Plummer co-starred in Oren Moverman's drama thriller film The Dinner. The film was released on May 5, 2017, and received mixed reviews. He played the kidnapped heir John Paul Getty III in Ridley Scott's crime thriller All the Money in the World. The film was released on December 25, 2017, and received positive reviews. The same year, Plummer portrayed the troubled teenager Charley who finds solace and purpose in his friendship with the titular racehorse in Andrew Haigh's drama Lean on Pete. The actor felt a deep desire to play the role after connecting strongly with the story, which spurred him to send a letter to Haigh, expressing his passion for the project. The film premiered at the Venice International Film Festival where his performance received critical acclaim; he was also awarded the Marcello Mastroianni Award for best emerging actor. Richard Lawson of Vanity Fair stated Plummer had "one of the most striking breakthrough performances of the year". The film was released on April 6, 2018, by A24.

In 2018, Plummer starred in Joshua Leonard's drama Dark Was the Night. He also appeared in Duncan  Skiles's suspense thriller The Clovehitch Killer.

In 2019, Plummer starred in Nabil Elderkin's feature film debut Gully. The film is set in a dystopian vision of Los Angeles and follows three disaffected teenagers, all victims of extreme childhoods, who are running a hedonistic riot as they try to work out a way in life. He also featured in Pippa Bianco's Share, produced by A24. In the same year, Plummer also had a leading role in Hulu's serial adaptation of John Green's novel Looking for Alaska, starring as 16-year-old Miles "Pudge" Halter. Released on October 18, the series and Plummer's performance garnered critical acclaim.

In 2020, Plummer starred in Thor Freudenthal's drama Words on Bathroom Walls, playing a young man diagnosed with schizophrenia, and headlined the dark comedy Spontaneous, directed by Brian Duffield and based on the novel of the same name by Aaron Starmer. Both films received positive reviews.

In 2022, Plummer starred in the coming of age drama Wildflower. The film received mixed reviews from critics. In 2023, he starred in National Anthem as Dylan, directed by Luke Gilford, which premiered at the 2023 SXSW Festival. The film was met with positive critical reviews, and his performance received critical acclaim.

Personal life 
Plummer lives in New York City and is a vegan. Prior to pursuing a full-time acting career, Plummer had considered dropping acting to become a general manager for a football team due to his passion for the sport.

Filmography

Film

Television

Music videos

Awards and nominations

References

External links 

 
 

Living people
American male film actors
American male television actors
American male child actors
People from Poughkeepsie, New York
People from Cold Spring, New York
Male actors from New York (state)
21st-century American male actors
Marcello Mastroianni Award winners
1999 births